Barbara Lawrence (1930–2013) was an American model and actress.

Barbara Lawrence may also refer to:

 Barbara Lawrence (zoologist) (1909–1997), American paleozoologist and museum curator
 Barbara Lawrence (politician) (born 1934), member of the Kansas State Legislature